Van Wyck Brooks (February 16, 1886 in Plainfield, New Jersey – May 2, 1963 in Bridgewater, Connecticut) was an American literary critic, biographer, and historian.

Biography 

Brooks graduated from Harvard University in 1908.  As a student he published his first book, a collection of poetry called Verses by Two Undergraduates, co-written with his friend John Hall Wheelock.

Brooks's best-known work is a series of studies entitled Makers and Finders (5 volumes, 1936–1952), which chronicled the development of American literature during the long 19th century. Brooks embroidered elaborate biographical detail into anecdotal prose. For The Flowering of New England, 1815–1865 (1936) he won the second National Book Award for Non-Fiction from the American Book Sellers Association and the 1937 Pulitzer Prize for History.  The book was also included in Life Magazine's list of the 100 outstanding books of 1924–1944.

Brooks was a long-time resident of Bridgewater, Connecticut, which built a town library wing in his name. Although a decade-long fund-raising effort was abandoned in 1972, a hermit in Los Angeles, Charles E. Piggott, with no connection to Bridgewater surprised the town by leaving money for the library in his will. With $210,000 raised, the library addition went up in 1980.

Among his works, the book The Ordeal of Mark Twain (1920) analyzes the literary progression of Samuel L. Clemens and attributes shortcomings to Clemens's mother and wife. In 1925 he published a translation from French of the 1920 biography of Henry David Thoreau by Leon Bazalgette, entitled Henry Thoreau, Bachelor of Nature.

In 1944, Brooks was on the cover of Time Magazine.

Bibliography 
 1905: Verses by Two Undergraduates (with John Hall Wheelock)
 1908: The Wine of the Puritans: A Study of Present-Day America
 1913: The Malady of the Ideal: Senancour, Maurice de Guérin, and Amiel
 1914: John Addington Symonds: A Biographical Study
 1915: The World of H.G. Wells
 1915: America's Coming of Age
 1920: The Ordeal of Mark Twain
 1925: The Pilgrimage of Henry James
 1925: Henry Thoreau, Bachelor of Nature (by Leon Bazalgette, translated by Van Wyck Brooks)
 1932: The Life of Emerson
 1934: Three Essays on America
 1936: The Flowering of New England, 1815-1865 (Makers and Finders)
 1940: New England: Indian Summer, 1865-1915 (Makers and Finders)
 1941: Opinions of Oliver Allston
 1941: On Literature Today
 1944: The World of Washington Irving (Makers and Finders)
 1947: The Times of Melville and Whitman (Makers and Finders)
 1948: A Chilmark Miscellany
 1952: The Confident Years: 1885-1915 (Makers and Finders)
 1952: Makers and Finders: A History of the Writer in America, 1800-1915
 1953: The Writer in America
 1954: Scenes and Portraits: Memoirs of Childhood and Youth (An Autobiography)
 1955: John Sloan: A Painter's Life
 1956: Helen Keller: Sketch for a Portrait
 1957: Days of the Phoenix: The Nineteen-Twenties I Remember (An Autobiography)
 1958: The Dream of Arcadia: American Writers and Artists in Italy, 1760-1915
 1958: From a Writer's Notebook
 1959: Howells: His Life and World
 1961: From the Shadow of the Mountain: My Post-Meridian Years (An Autobiography)
 1962: Fenollosa and His Circle: With Other Essays in Biography
 1965: An Autobiography

Awards and honors

Places named after him 
The Van Wyck Brooks Historic District, known for its old Victorian and Second French Empire style buildings in Plainfield, the town of his birth, is named after him.

Prizes 
 1937: Pulitzer Prize in history and National Book Award for 1936 nonfiction
 1938: Goldmedaille des Limited Editions Club
 1944: Carey Thomas Award for The World of Washington Irving
 1946: Goldmedal of National Institute of Arts and Letters (American Academy of Arts and Letters)
 1953: Theodore Roosevelt Distinguished Service Medal
 1954: Huntington Hartford Foundation Award
 1957: Secondary Education Board Award for Helen Keller: Sketch for a Portrait

Honorary degrees 

Doctor of Letters:
 Boston University
 Bowdoin College
 Columbia University
 Dartmouth College
 Fairleigh Dickinson University
 Harvard University
 Northeastern Illinois University
 Tufts University
 Union College
 University of Pennsylvania

Doctor of Humane Letters:
 Northwestern University

References

Further reading 

 Blake, Casey Nelson (1990). Beloved Community: The Cultural Criticism of Randolph Bourne, Van Wyck Brooks, Waldo Frank & Lewis Mumford. Chapel Hill: University of North Carolina Press. .

External links 
 Van Wyck Brooks papers, 1872-1983, Kislak Center for Special Collections, Rare Books and Manuscripts, University of Pennsylvania
 
 
 
 
Finding aid to Van Wyck Brooks papers at Columbia University. Rare Book & Manuscript Library.

1886 births
1963 deaths
Writers from Plainfield, New Jersey
American literary critics
Pulitzer Prize for History winners
Humanism
Harvard University alumni
20th-century American historians
20th-century American male writers
Historians of the American West
Historians of the United States
National Book Award winners
People from Bridgewater, Connecticut
American male non-fiction writers
Historians from New Jersey
Historians from Connecticut
Members of the American Academy of Arts and Letters